Bandung Raya (en: Greater Bandung) was an Indonesian professional association football club from Bandung. The club was founded on 17 June 1987. It played in Galatama until the formation of the Liga Indonesia Premier Division in 1994, playing in that division until the club was dissolved in 1997 owing to financial difficulties. It was then re-established in 2010 by Ari D. Sutedi.

History 
Bandung Raya was founded in Bandung on 17 June 1987. It competed in Galatama until 1994 when the Football Association of Indonesia merged the two top-tier leagues (Galatama and Perserikatan) into Liga Indonesia Premier Division. While Bandung Raya mostly ended in mid-table positions in Galatama, its best performances were manifested in the Liga Indonesia Premier Division, in which the club won once and finished as runner-up once.

In 1994–95, Bandung Raya finished third in the West Division and advanced to the quarterfinals, which were played as a group stage. The team finished third and did not advance to the semi-finals. Bandung Raya's striker Peri Sandria was the league's top goalscorer, with 34 goals in 37 matches.

In the 1995–96 Liga Indonesia Premier Division, Bandung Raya won its Conference and advanced to the quarterfinals, finishing at the top of its group. Bandung Raya secured the championship by beating Mitra Surabaya in a penalty shoot-out in the semi-finals and PSM Makassar 2–0 in the finals. The club's striker, Dejan Gluscevic, was the league's top goalscorer with 30 goals in 33 matches.

The following year Bandung Raya was runner-up in the 1996–97 Liga Indonesia Premier Division, after losing 1–3 against Persebaya Surabaya in the finals. Bandung Raya's defender Nuralim was named as the league's best player of the season. This was the club's last match, as it was dissolved at the end of the season due to financial difficulties. Most of the players moved to Persija Jakarta.

Bandung Raya competed in the Asian Cup Winners Cup in 1996–97, reaching the second round by beating Malaysian club Pahang FA 5–1 on aggregate. Bandung Raya was eliminated after losing 1–5 on aggregate against South China AA from Hong Kong.

It was suggested that Bandung FC, founded in 2010 for the short-lived Liga Primer Indonesia, was a reborn Bandung Raya, although both teams denied any relationship.

In 2012, Ari D. Sutedi, the club owner, acquired 100% ownership of Indonesia Super League (ISL) club Pelita Jaya. Instead of merging, both clubs maintain their existences.

Chairman 
1987–1997 : Tri Goestoro
2010– : Ari D. Sutedi

Performance

National competition 
1987–1988 : 14th place in Galatama
1988–1989 : 7th place in Galatama
1989–1990 : 17th place in Galatama
1990–1992 : 17th in Galatama
1993–1994 : 8th place in West group, Galatama
1994–1995 : Quarterfinal in Liga Indonesia Premier Division
1995–1996 : Champion in Liga Indonesia Premier Division
1996–1997 : Runner-up in Liga Indonesia Premier Division

Continental competition 
1996–1997 : Round of 16 in Asian Cup Winners Cup

Stadium 
Bandung Raya played their home matches at Siliwangi Stadium, which has a capacity of 20,000 seats. The club shared the stadium with its local rival Persib Bandung.

Supporters 
Bandung Raya's supporters are called "Baraya" which means family. sometimes Bandung people support Persib and Bandung Raya because both have good achievements.

Honours 
Champion of Liga Indonesia Premier Division in 1995–1996
Runner-up of Liga Indonesia Premier Division in 1996–1997

Notable coach's 

Bold is winning manager of Indonesian League

References

External links 
 Bandung Raya at a glance (Indonesian)

Football clubs in Indonesia
Association football clubs established in 1987
Indonesian Premier Division winners
1987 establishments in Indonesia
Defunct football clubs in Indonesia